William Gordon Taylor (October 14, 1942 – September 8, 1979) was a professional ice hockey centre who played two games in the National Hockey League. He is the son of the former NHL hockey player, Billy Taylor Sr.

Playing career
Taylor spent most of his playing career in various minor leagues on various teams from 1960 to 1968. He managed to play only two games in the NHL for the New York Rangers during the 1964–65 NHL season, recording no points.

After retirement as a player, he spent one season, 1971–72, as a head coach for the Guelph CMC's of the Southern Ontario Junior A Hockey League.  That season the CMC's went on to win the Manitoba Centennial Cup as National Tier II Junior "A" Champions under Taylor's watch.

According to the New York Rangers' website, Taylor died on September 8, 1979.

References

External links

1942 births
1979 deaths
Baltimore Clippers players
Buffalo Bisons (AHL) players
Canadian ice hockey centres
Guelph Royals players
Ice hockey people from Saskatchewan
Memphis South Stars players
New York Rangers players
St. Louis Braves players